Delivery service may refer to:

 Package delivery (or parcel delivery)
 Food delivery
 Service delivery framework, a set of business standards